The 83rd Pennsylvania was a volunteer infantry regiment in the Union Army during the American Civil War, which participated in almost every major battle in the East, including Seven Days Battles, Antietam, Fredericksburg, Gettysburg, Petersburg and Appomattox Court House.

As one of four regiments in the 3rd Brigade, 1st Division, V Corps, Army of the Potomac, it fought alongside the 20th Maine, 44th New York, and the 16th Michigan in the defense of Little Round Top. Colonel Strong Vincent, the regiment's commanding officer, was mortally wounded during this engagement.

The 83rd Pennsylvania suffered the second-highest number of battle deaths among Union Army infantry regiments during the war, second only to the 5th New Hampshire.

Future Medal of Honor recipient Leander Herron served in the 83rd Pennsylvania from December 1863 to June 1865.

Casualties 
During its time of service, the 83rd Pennsylvania lost 11 officers and 271 men killed in combat and 2 officers and 151 men died from disease or accidents. 435 men in total died during the regiment's time of service, amounting to 24% of its enlistments.

See also
List of Pennsylvania Civil War regiments

References

1865 disestablishments in Pennsylvania
Military units and formations disestablished in 1865
Military units and formations established in 1861
Units and formations of the Union Army from Pennsylvania
1861 establishments in Pennsylvania